Purdue University and the associated university system have had 13 official and 5 officially acting presidents since the university was founded in 1869.

List of presidents

† - died in office.

References

Presidents of Purdue University

Purdue University presidents
Purdue